John Forbes, M.D. (1798–1823) was an English botanist.

Forbes was born in 1798, and became a pupil of John Shepherd of the Liverpool botanic garden. The Horticultural Society despatched him to the east coast of Africa, and he left London in February 1822, in the expedition commanded by Captain William Fitzwilliam Owen.

He sent home substantial collections from Madeira, Rio de Janeiro, the Cape of Good Hope, and Madagascar, after which he decided to march up the Zambesi River to the Portuguese station at Zumbo, three hundred leagues from the mouth of the river, and thence southwards to the Cape. He succumbed to fatigue and privation at Sena, in August 1823, before travelling half the distance. The genus Forbesia, Eckl., commemorates him as collector.

References

1798 births
1823 deaths
19th-century British botanists